Dream 11: Feather Weight Grand Prix 2009 Final Round was a mixed martial arts event promoted by Fighting and Entertainment Group's mixed martial arts promotion Dream held on October 6, 2009.

Background

Dream 11 was the culmination of the Feather Weight Grand Prix, where both the semifinals and finals took place in the same night. It also featured the semifinals of the Super Hulk Grand Prix 2009. Additionally, there was a championship bout: Joachim Hansen defended the Dream Lightweight Championship against Shinya Aoki.

Dream's featherweight division has a  weight limit.

Results

See also
 Dream (mixed martial arts)
 List of Dream champions
 2009 in DREAM

Notes
Dream 11 was the second and last Dream event to be shown live in primetime on Tokyo Broadcasting System during 2009.
Eddie Alvarez and Gesias Cavalcante were briefly rumored to meet at Dream 11. However, due to Eddie Alvarez's contractual obligations to Bellator Fighting Championships, the fight was scrapped early in negotiations.
Kazuyuki Miayata and Takeshi Yamazaki fought at DEEP 42 IMPACT to decide who would fight DJ.Taiki in the Feather Weight Grand Prix Reserve bout.
An early rumored bout placed Ronaldo Souza against Jason "Mayhem" Miller in a rematch for the Dream Middleweight Championship. However, the bout was scrapped after Ronaldo Souza signed with Strikeforce.
Though featured on the Dream 11 promotion material, Norifumi "KID" Yamamoto did not participate in the event, as he is taking a hiatus to train outside Japan, and will return to MMA competition at Dynamite!! 2009.
Gegard Mousasi advanced to the Second Round of the Super Hulk Grand Prix after defeating Mark Hunt at Dream 9, but had to pull out of the tournament due to an injury.
A bout between Daisuke Nakamura and Gesias Cavalcante had original been planned for Dream 11. However, due to a knee injury sustained by Calvancante, the bout was reportedly scrapped. This resulted in Nakamura being moved to Dream 12.

2009 Featherweight Grand Prix Bracket

Note: Norifumi Yamamoto was given a first-round bye so he could recover from an ankle injury he received in 2008.
Note: Hideo Tokoro replaced Daiki Hata after Hata was unable to continue due to an eye injury.

Dream Featherweight Grand Prix Reserve Bouts:
 Kazuyuki Miyata def.  Daiki Hata at Dream 11

Super Hulk Grand Prix 2009 Bracket

 Note: Bob Sapp was brought back into the tournament replacing Gegard Mousasi after Mousasi was injured

References

Dream (mixed martial arts) events
2009 in mixed martial arts
Sport in Yokohama
Mixed martial arts in Japan
2009 in Japan